How Not to Die may refer to:
 A 2008 book by Jan Garavaglia
 A 2015 book subtitled Discover the Foods Scientifically Proven to Prevent and Reverse Disease by Michael Greger, M.D.